Interstate 5 (I-5) is a major north–south route of the Interstate Highway System in the United States, stretching from the Mexican border at the San Ysidro crossing to the Canadian border near Blaine, Washington. It is the longest interstate in California, and accounts for more than half of I-5's total length.

It is the more important and most-used of the two major north–south routes on the Pacific Coast, the other being U.S. Route 101 (US 101), which is primarily coastal. I-5 links the major California cities of San Diego, Santa Ana, Los Angeles, Stockton, Sacramento, and Redding.

I-5 is known colloquially as "the 5" to Southern California residents and "5" to Northern California residents due to varieties in California English. I-5 also has several named portions: the John J. Montgomery Freeway, San Diego Freeway, Santa Ana Freeway, Golden State Freeway, and West Side Freeway.

Route description 

I-5 is part of the California Freeway and Expressway System, and is part of the National Highway System, a network of highways that are considered essential to the country's economy, defense, and mobility by the Federal Highway Administration. The segment of I-5 from State Route 89 (SR 89) to US 97 forms part of the Volcanic Legacy Scenic Byway, an All-American Road. I-5 is also eligible to be included in the State Scenic Highway System; however, it is a scenic highway as designated by the California Department of Transportation (Caltrans) only from SR 152 to I-580.

San Diego County
I-5 begins at the San Ysidro Port of Entry from Mexico in the San Ysidro neighborhood of San Diego. Immediately after the border, I-805 splits off to the northeast and serves as a bypass of I-5 that avoids Downtown San Diego. I-5 itself continues northwest and meets the western end of SR 905, a route that connects with the Otay Mesa border crossing. I-5 then continues northward and joins the southern end of SR 75, a highway connecting to Coronado via the Silver Strand. I-5 then enters Chula Vista, briefly leaving the San Diego city limits. It continues along the east side of San Diego Bay where it intersects with SR 54 and enters National City. From there, I-5 veers around Naval Base San Diego and reenters the city limits of San Diego. I-5 subsequently intersects with four state routes: the southern end of SR 15 (the extension of I-15), SR 75 and the Coronado Bay Bridge, the western end of SR 94, and SR 163. In addition to serving Downtown San Diego, I-5 also provides access to Balboa Park from the Pershing Drive exit. The portion of I-5 from the Mexican border to SR 94 at downtown San Diego is named the John J. Montgomery Freeway in honor of John J. Montgomery, a pioneer aviator who flew a glider from a location near Chula Vista in 1884.

I-5 continues northwest from downtown as the San Diego Freeway until it reaches its junction with I-8, then turns slightly to the north while passing SeaWorld and Mission Bay. Thereafter, I-5 intersects the western end of SR 52 near La Jolla before entering University City. At Nobel Drive, the San Diego LDS Temple towers over I-5. Shortly afterward, I‑5 passes through the UC San Diego campus and intersects the northern terminus of I-805 before continuing north and intersecting the western end of SR 56. At this interchange, there is a local bypass that provides the only access to Carmel Mountain Road from both directions and provides the only direct access to SR 56 going northbound.

North of the San Diego city limits, I-5 enters the city limits of Solana Beach, and then three incorporated cities to the north: Encinitas, Carlsbad and Oceanside. This segment is currently undergoing expansion as part of the North Coast Corridor project. In Oceanside, I-5 intersects the SR 78 freeway and the SR 76 expressway and continues through Camp Pendleton. It then follows the Pacific Ocean coastline for the next . Toward the northern end of its routing through Camp Pendleton, I-5 passes through San Onofre State Beach and near the San Onofre Nuclear Generating Station. I-5 enters Orange County at the Cristianitos Road exit.

Orange County

Upon entering Orange County, I-5 goes through San Clemente. At Dana Point, I-5 turns inland while SR 1 continues along the coast. I-5 then heads due north through San Juan Capistrano and Mission Viejo, intersecting the SR 73 toll road heading northwest. I-5 continues to the El Toro Y interchange with I-405 in southeastern Irvine, splitting into lanes for regular traffic as well as for truck traffic (though autos can use these lanes as well). From that point, I-405 takes over the San Diego Freeway designation, while I-5 becomes the Santa Ana Freeway as it runs southeast to northwest.

After the El Toro Y junction, I-5 intersects SR 133, a toll road that eventually connects to SR 241. Just before the Tustin city limits, I-5 passes over SR 261, the final toll road of the Eastern Transportation Corridor, but traffic must use Jamboree Road to access the latter. I-5 then intersects SR 55 and enters Santa Ana, the county seat of Orange County. Towards the northern side of Santa Ana, I-5 intersects both SR 57 and SR 22 in what is known as the Orange Crush interchange. Following this, I-5 briefly enters the city of Orange and then traverses Anaheim, passing along the north side of Disneyland. I-5 then intersects SR 91, passes through Buena Park and crosses into Los Angeles County.

Los Angeles County

After crossing the county line, I-5 goes through several cities southeast of Los Angeles, including La Mirada, Santa Fe Springs, and Norwalk. In Downey, I-5 intersects I-605, which serves as a north–south connector route between the cities east of Los Angeles, including those in the San Gabriel Valley. I-5 then enters Commerce, passing the Citadel Outlets shopping center, and intersects I-710 before entering the large unincorporated community of East Los Angeles and later the city proper of Los Angeles. At this interchange, I-10, SR 60, and US 101 intersect; I-10 continues north on I-5 for about  before continuing east towards San Bernardino and points farther east.

On the north side of downtown, the Golden State Freeway follows the Los Angeles River, intersects SR 110 and SR 2 and passes along the eastern side of Griffith Park. The route continues through the San Fernando Valley, intersecting the Ventura Freeway (SR 134). It briefly enters the city of Glendale and then Burbank, passing near Burbank Airport before reentering the Los Angeles city limits and intersecting the northern end of the Hollywood Freeway (SR 170). Near the city of San Fernando, I-5 intersects SR 118. Following this, I-5 intersects three routes in succession: the northern end of I-405, the western end of I-210, and the southern end of SR 14 at the Newhall Pass interchange. It then crosses the Newhall Pass through the Santa Susana Mountains into the Santa Clarita Valley. I-5's carpool lanes also have direct connectors with the carpool lanes on the SR 170 and SR 14 freeways (an additional direct connector with the HOV lanes on I-405 near Mission Hills is planned.) This allows a continuous HOV lane to run from Palmdale to North Hollywood via SR 14 to I-5 to SR 170.

I-5 continues along the western city limits of Santa Clarita and passes Six Flags Magic Mountain, intersecting SR 126 just north of there. The Golden State Freeway then rises sharply, passing by Lake Castaic and undergoing a unique crossover resulting in a left-driving configuration for about  before the highway crosses back into its standard alignment. It passes Pyramid Lake and intersects SR 138 before crossing the Tejon Pass through the Tehachapi Mountains, with Path 26 power lines generally paralleling the freeway.

The stretch of I-5 through the Tejon Pass and Grapevine typically gets snow at higher elevations during the winter. Although Caltrans may require vehicles to use snow tires, snow chains, or other traction devices during and after snowstorms, the California Highway Patrol will instead usually close this segment altogether during these conditions because of the steep grade of the pass, and the amount of passenger traffic and big-rigs that generally use the corridor. Whenever there is such a closure, traffic must either wait for it to reopen, or endure a multi-hour detour. An automated gate on the freeway's median in Castaic north of Lake Hughes Road allows drivers to turn around when such closures occur.

Central Valley
From SR 99 to Woodland, I-5 is known as the West Side Freeway. I-5 parallels SR 33, skirting along the far more remote western edge of the Central Valley, and is largely removed from the major population centers such as Bakersfield, Fresno and Modesto; other state highways provide connections. I-5 still runs within the vicinity of Avenal, Coalinga, Los Banos, and a handful of other smaller cities on the western edge of the Central Valley. For most of this section, the Path 15 electrical transmission corridor follows the highway, forming an infrastructure corridor along with the California Aqueduct. After the Grapevine, I-5 crosses the California Aqueduct. This is first time out of 5 times that I-5 crosses the aqueduct.

North of the Grapevine, I-5 intersects SR 166, SR 119 and SR 43 before meeting SR 58, a highway that continues east to Bakersfield, near the town of Buttonwillow. I-5 then intersects SR 46 before entering Kings County. From the Utica Avenue exit to I-580, I-5 parallels the eastern foothills of the Diablo Range. It crosses the California Aqueduct for the second time. In Kings County, I-5 intersects SR 41 before briefly entering the city limits of Avenal, where it intersects SR 269. In Fresno County, I-5 intersects SR 198 and SR 145 before running concurrently with SR 33 for several miles. I-5 then crosses into Merced County, intersecting SR 165, SR 152 and SR 33 near the San Luis Reservoir (where SR 152 provides a major connection to the Monterey Peninsula and the Silicon Valley), and SR 140 at the Stanislaus county line. I-5 crosses the California Aqueduct for the third time between SR 152 and SR 33 and again near Crows Landing.

In San Joaquin County, I-580 splits off from I-5 south of Tracy, providing a spur-route connection to the San Francisco Bay Area. From here, I-5 crosses the California Aqueduct for the final time and intersects SR 132, a major route to Modesto and the mountains in the east, as well as the northern end of SR 33. After passing Tracy, I-5 intersects I-205, a connector route to I-580, before intersecting the SR 120 freeway near Manteca. After passing through Lathrop, I-5 heads due north through Stockton, intersecting the SR 4 freeway that provides access to downtown Stockton. I-5 passes through the western portion of the Lodi city limits before intersecting SR 12 and entering Sacramento County.

I-5 enters the city of Elk Grove while passing along the eastern edge of the Stone Lakes National Wildlife Refuge. It then crosses into the Sacramento city limits, soon paralleling the Sacramento River before intersecting the Capital City Freeway, which carries US 50 and I-80 Business (I-80 Bus.). SR 99 merges with I-5 at this point, and the two routes pass through the western half of Downtown Sacramento. Following the bridge over the American River, I-5 and SR 99 intersect the major transcontinental route of I-80. Just as I-5 leaves Sacramento, SR 99 splits off and continues north while I-5 turns due west past Sacramento International Airport and crosses the Sacramento River into Yolo County. In Woodland, the SR 113 freeway merges with I-5 before exiting to the north. The Interstate heads northwest again toward Dunnigan, where it converges with I-505.

I-5 skirts north along the western edge of the Sacramento Valley, bypassing the larger cities of the region, including Yuba City, Oroville and Chico, before reaching Red Bluff. From Dunnigan, I-5 enters Colusa County, passing through the city of Williams and intersecting SR 20. In Glenn County, I-5 intersects SR 162 in Willows and SR 32 in Orland. I-5 then crosses into Tehama County, passing through Corning before entering Red Bluff and intersecting SR 36, which connects to the northern end of SR 99. I-5 crosses the Sacramento River twice before entering Shasta County.

Cascade Region
I-5 then enters the Shasta Cascade region, intersecting SR 273 in Anderson before passing through Redding and intersecting SR 44 and SR 299. The freeway then continues through the city of Shasta Lake, intersecting SR 151, before crossing over Shasta Lake on the Pit River Bridge and climbing up to near the foot of Mount Shasta. Just north of the bridge over Shasta Lake, I-5 also boasts the second-largest median in California after I-8's In‑Ko‑Pah grade. In Siskiyou County, I-5 passes through Dunsmuir before intersecting SR 89 near Lake Siskiyou and entering the city of Mount Shasta. North of here, US 97 intersects I-5 in Weed, providing access to Klamath Falls, Oregon. The Interstate then continues to Yreka, intersecting SR 3 and SR 96 before crossing the Klamath River and reaching the Oregon border and the Siskiyou Summit.

North of Redding, I-5 regularly gets snow at higher elevations from fall to spring. Caltrans sometimes requires vehicles to use snow tires, snow chains, or other traction devices in the mountains during and after snowstorms. Checkpoints are often set up to enforce chain restrictions on vehicles bound for icy or snowy areas. When chain restrictions are in effect, vehicles must have chains on the driving wheels, except 4WD vehicles with snow tires. Additionally, during the winter season, trucks are required to carry chains whether or not controls are in force.

History

Historical naming
The portion of this highway from Los Angeles to San Diego was also co-signed as US 101 until 1964–1968. The portion of this highway from Woodland to Red Bluff roughly follows old US 99W.

In California, the former western branch of Interstate 5 (the northern end of the spur into the Bay Area) connecting I-80 out of Vacaville to near Dunnigan, previously known as I-5W, was renamed I-505. Interstate 580 running between I-5 and I-80 was also once designated 5W; what is now I-5 (the stretch that runs through Sacramento) had been originally designated I-5E.

The term "Golden State Highway" was the popular name for US 99, stretching from Mexico to Canada through the length of California.  Since the construction of I-5, it has taken over the term "Golden State Freeway" from 99 south of the latter's southern terminus in Kern County.

Los Angeles area
The Golden State Freeway was proposed by the California Highway Commission in 1953. The proposal drew strong criticism from East Los Angeles residents as it would dissect and eliminate large residential and commercial areas of Boyle Heights and Hollenbeck Heights. The proposal also seemed to indicate a disregard for the ethnic Mexican American population of metropolitan Los Angeles. The "Boyle–Hollenbeck Anti–Golden State Freeway Committee" was formed for the purpose of blocking or rerouting the freeway. Then–Los Angeles City Council member Edward R. Roybal chaired that committee. Despite this opposition, the construction of the freeway went ahead.

When this section was completed in 1956, the newspaper The Eastside Sun wrote the freeway led to the "eradication, obliteration, razing, moving, ripping asunder, demolishing of Eastside homes."

The freeway between Orange County and Los Angeles was originally designed to have three lanes on each side. Due to high demand of cars, the freeway started undergoing major extensions and widening in the early 1990s in Orange County. Work from SR 91 north through the Los Angeles–Orange County line was completed in 2010. The improvements between the county line and the East Los Angeles Interchange are scheduled to be complete by 2023.

Newhall Pass

The original route went through the towns of Saugus and Newhall, and then crossed Newhall Pass (current route of SR 14, the Antelope Valley Freeway). In 1862, Beale's Cut was made in the construction of a toll wagon road. The  by  "slot" was dug with picks and shovels. That road would become part of the Midway Route. At the turn of the century, it was the most direct automobile route between Los Angeles and the San Joaquin Valley via the Mojave Desert and Tehachapi Pass.

In 1910, Beale's Cut was bypassed by the Newhall Tunnel. Constructed by Los Angeles County, it was too narrow for two trucks to pass each other inside. As a result, in 1939, the tunnel was completely removed (or "daylighted") when the road was widened to four lanes. Additionally, by 1930, a bypass road was constructed to avoid Newhall Pass via Weldon and Gavin canyons, which is the current route of I-5.

Both routes were eventually built as freeways. The Gavin Canyon route became I-5, and the main north–south route via the Ridge Route. The Newhall Pass route became SR 14, which is the main route between Los Angeles and the growing high desert communities of the Antelope Valley. It is also still a part of the important Midway Route, which is the primary alternate route when I-5 is closed (via SR 58 and SR 14).

The interchange has partially collapsed twice due to earthquakes: the 1971 Sylmar earthquake and the 1994 Northridge earthquake. As a result of the 1994 collapse, this interchange was renamed the "Clarence Wayne Dean Memorial Interchange", honoring a Los Angeles Police Department motorcycle officer killed when he was unable to stop in time and drove off the collapsed flyover ramp from SR 14 south to I-5 south. After both earthquakes, the collapsed portions were rebuilt and surviving portions reinforced.

In the evening of October 12, 2007, two trucks collided in the southbound tunnel that takes the truck bypass roadway under the main lanes near the Newhall Pass interchange. Fifteen trucks caught fire, killing three people and injuring ten.

Ridge Route

The Ridge Route refers to the section of highway between Castaic and Grapevine, through the Tejon Pass. The highway had its origins in the early 1910s, when a route was needed to connect Los Angeles to the Central Valley. Some believed that the only option was the route through the Mojave Desert and the Tehachapi Mountains, but a new route was discovered through the Tejon Pass. This route became known as the Ridge Route and saw almost constant planning, construction, and improvement from 1914 to 1970.

The first road was completed in 1915. However, the need for improvements was realized soon after it was completed. The road was paved after World War I, and several blind turns were opened up ("daylighted"). Even with these improvements in the 1920s, it became clear that a new route was needed to keep up with increasing demand.

In 1927, plans were drawn up for a "Ridge Route Alternate", named as it was planned as an addition to the existing Ridge Route and not as a replacement. It opened in 1933 as a three-lane highway through the mountains. The middle or "suicide lane" was used as an overtaking lane for cars in both directions. This route was a great improvement, faster and  shorter than the old Ridge Route, but was not enough to satisfy demand, and a conversion to a four-lane expressway was needed. The outbreak of World War II delayed this until 1948 and the fourth lane was completed in 1952. However, just three years later, plans were begun for converting the four-lane expressway to a six-lane freeway.

The last major alteration to the Ridge Route began in the early 1960s. By then, the plan for a six-lane freeway had expanded to eight lanes. This construction project made the most changes to the route. Many of the curves that followed the mountainside were cut through. To climb the mountain on the south side of Castaic more easily, traffic lanes were reversed (southbound lanes to the east and northbound lanes to the west). To prevent head-on collisions, the two ends of the route were separated on two different mountainsides, and the section through Piru Canyon was moved to an entirely new alignment to make room for Pyramid Lake. The project was completed by 1970 and brought the Ridge Route to its current alignment.

San Joaquin Valley

When the Interstate Highway System was created in 1956, there was discussion about which way to route the interstate through the San Joaquin Valley (Central Valley). Two proposals were considered. One was to convert the Golden State Highway (US 99, later SR 99) into a freeway. The other was to use the proposed West Side Freeway (current Interstate 5). The Golden State Highway route would serve many farming communities across the San Joaquin Valley, but the West Side Freeway proposal would bypass all the Central Valley communities and thus provide a faster and more direct north–south route through the state and so was eventually chosen.

Construction began in the early 1960s. The first phase, completed in 1967, ran from the San Joaquin County line to Los Banos. The second phase, completed in 1972, extended the freeway south to Wheeler Ridge and connected it to SR 99. The freeway then started to see traffic, as in Stockton there were only  between the West Side Freeway and the Golden State Highway. The third phase, completed in 1979, extended the freeway to Sacramento and connected it to the northern I-5.

When the second phase of the freeway opened in 1972, it was a long and lonely route with no businesses alongside. Services were not easily available as the nearest towns were miles away and generally out of sight. It was common for cars to run out of fuel. Over time the West Side Freeway (I-5) saw the development of businesses serving the needs of travelers. For years, there has still been interest in designating the Golden State Highway route as its own interstate, I-9.

The median on I-5 between Wheeler Ridge and Tracy is wide enough to accommodate widening the West Side Freeway to six or eight lanes, should the need arise.

I-5W and the San Francisco Bay Area

I-5's more direct Los Angeles-to-Sacramento route bypasses San Francisco, San Jose, Oakland, and the rest of the San Francisco Bay Area. Original plans also called for a loop Interstate with a directional suffix, I-5W. This route now roughly corresponds to I-580 from I-5 south of Tracy to Oakland, I-80 from Oakland to Vacaville, and I-505 from Vacaville to I-5 near Dunnigan. I-5W and most of the other Interstates around the country with directional suffixes were eventually renumbered or eliminated, except I-35E and I-35W in Texas and Minnesota. Nevertheless, San Francisco is still listed as a control city on northbound I-5 between SR 99 and I-580.

Sacramento area
Interstate 5 in Downtown Sacramento closely follows the Sacramento River. This has resulted in complex engineering work to keep the section dry due to it being located below the water table. Locally, Caltrans refers to this part of the freeway as the "Boat Section". Caltrans began constructing this section during the 1960s and 1970s. The freeway was engineered below grade so it would be out of the view of offices and shops in Downtown Sacramento. To achieve this, the site was excavated and the seeping water was pumped from the area. An intricate drainage system, water pump and retaining wall are used to protect the freeway from the Sacramento River. However, the system slowly clogged up over the years with sand and silt buildup  Major repair work of the Boat Section began on May 30, 2008. The construction was to take 40 days to complete, requiring complete northbound and southbound closures on an alternating schedule.

Exit list

Newhall Pass truck route
The I-5 truck route through the Newhall Pass Interchange in Sylmar has its own separate exits. The route runs from the I-210 interchange to north of the SR 14 interchange.

Related routes
There are six signed auxiliary Interstate Highways associated with I-5 in California:
 I-105 runs from SR 1 near El Segundo and Los Angeles International Airport (LAX) east to I-605 in Norwalk.
 I-205 runs from I-580 to I-5, forming the north side of a triangle around Tracy.
 I-405 is a bypass route of I-5, running along the southern and western parts of Greater Los Angeles from Irvine north to near San Fernando.
 I-505 runs from I-80 in Vacaville north to I-5 near Dunnigan.
 I-605 runs from I-405 and SR 22 in Seal Beach north to I-210 in Duarte.
 I-805 is a bypass route of I-5 in the San Diego area, running from the San Diego district of San Ysidro near the Mexico–U.S. border to near Del Mar.

There is also one unsigned auxiliary Interstate Highway: I-305 runs along US 50 from I-80 in West Sacramento to SR 99 in Sacramento.

There is one future auxiliary Interstate Highway: SR 905 from I-5 in San Diego to the Mexico–U.S. border in Otay Mesa is proposed to become I-905.

There are also several business routes of Interstate 5 in California, primarily parts of the original routing of US 99.

See also

References

External links

 Interstate 5 at Interstate-Guide.com
 Interstate 5 at California @ AARoads.com
 Caltrans: Interstate 5 highway conditions
 Interstate 5 at California Highways
 History of the Northern Los Angeles County section of Interstate 5 (Photos, text, TV shows)
 Interstate 5 in the Los Angeles Area
 US 99 Tour in Southern California

05
California
005
Interstate 05
Interstate 05
Interstate 05
Interstate 05
Interstate 05
Interstate 05
Interstate 05
Interstate 05
Interstate 05
Interstate 05
Interstate 05
Interstate 05
Interstate 05
Interstate 05
Interstate 05
Interstate 05
005
Interstate 05 in California